Sam Spiegel (born October 31, 1979), known by the stage name Sam i, is an American DJ, producer, composer, and director from New York City.

As a child, Spiegel studied classical voice, cello, and flute. By his teens, he loved hip hop music.

In addition to creating his own material, Spiegel has worked with musicians such as Kanye West, Lizzo, Sia, Busta Rhymes, Doja Cat, Anderson .Paak, M.I.A., Maroon 5, and the Yeah Yeah Yeahs and many more. He has scored commercials for companies including Converse, Levi's, Kenzo x H&M, Reebok, ESPN, T Mobile, Jose Cuervo, and Saturn. His production company scored the video game Skate 2. Though he attempts to create music free of record label restraints, Spiegel also licenses his songs whenever possible so as to maximize exposure for his work. He formerly produced albums under the name Squeak E. Clean.

Spiegel is the brother of film director Spike Jonze. They collaborated on the Adidas TV commercial Hello Tomorrow, for which Spiegel created the score sung by Karen O. The titular song briefly reached No. 1 on the iTunes singles chart. Spiegel also wrote the score for Jonze's 2010 short film I'm Here, and produced an original song "Mutant Brain" with Ape Drums featuring Assassin for Jonze's Kenzo World advertisement.

Spiegel is a founding partner of Squeak E. Clean Studios. They have studios in L.A., New York, Chicago, Austin, Sydney and Melbourne.

Music 
2009 saw the release of one of Sam's music projects, N.A.S.A.'s (North America South America) landmark debut LP, The Spirit of Apollo. Created with long time Brazilian music partner DJ Zegon.

The Spirit of Apollo includes Kanye West, Karen O and Nick Zinner of Yeah Yeah Yeahs, Lykke Li, John Frusciante of Red Hot Chili Peppers, Tom Waits, Nina Persson of The Cardigans, George Clinton, David Byrne, M.I.A., RZA, Method Man, Ghostface Killah, and Ol' Dirty Bastard of Wu-Tang Clan while the corresponding music videos feature animated/live action collaborations by visual artists including Shepard Fairey, Sage Vaughn, Marcel Dzama, and The Date Farmers. Such collaborations earned Spiegel the title "King Sam" on Rolling Stones annual "Hot List" in 2008. The album was "a conscious effort by NASA to show how people can be brought together by music and art."

Spiegel's project, Maximum Hedrum, brought him together with Harold Faltermeyer and Derrick Green (of Sepultura). In 2011 "Keep in Touch (Feel Me)" feat. George Clinton, was licensed to a BlackBerry commercial. In November 2012 "Keep in Touch (Feel Me)" and "Synthesize", two tracks from the upcoming album, were released commercially on iTunes and Amazon.com, as well as via free download from SoundCloud and Facebook. "Synthesize" was featured in Girl Skateboards film, Pretty Sweet.

In 2016, Spiegel began releasing music under his own name, Sam Spiegel. The first release under this new moniker was "Mutant Brain (feat. Assassin)" which he produced with Miami-based DJ and producer, Ape Drums and released through Interscope Records. "Mutant Brain" was featured in the Spike Jonze-directed short film, "Kenzo World, A New Fragrance", for the French brand Kenzo.

This music went on to win gold for the Use of Original Music in Film Craft at the Cannes Lions, as well as winning the Best Music category at the AICP One Show and Best Use of Original Music by a Music House at the Guild of Music Supervisors Awards.

In 2020, Spiegel changed his name to Sam I and released his first solo album, Random Shit From The Internet Era. The album was a critical success and featured notable talent including Sia, Busta Rhymes, CeeLo Green, Anderson .Paak, Doja Cat, RZA and many more.

In addition, Sam has been working frequently with artist Jean Paul Goude in creating music for Jean Paul's work with Chanel, Lacoste, Kenzo X H&M, Roger Vivier, and Pompidou.

Sam continues to release his own music, produce for other artists while directing and growing Squeak E. Clean Studios.

Directing 
2015 saw Sam take on directing. His self funded music video for the final N.A.S.A. song, "Jihad Love Squad" was shot in India and directed and produced by Spiegel himself. Following the release of the "Jihad Love Squad" video, Sam signed to Hey Wonderful, a division of RSA Films, as a director. This led to Sam directing two National Geographic short films as well as CNN's first live commercial, which aired at 11:35 Eastern on New Year's Eve, 2017, during CNN's NYE Countdown and received nearly 3.3 million live viewers. Sam has continued his passion for directing into the 2018 year, with an Instagram interview campaign shot in May 2018 for Pride Month featuring LGBTQ advocates and their role models. In September Sam also conceptualized, directed and wrote "Wu-Tang in Space Eating Impossible Sliders" a branded content mini web series starring Wu-Tang Clan flying through space and postulating on the universe. The series highlighted the new partnership between Impossible Foods and White Castle.

Music direction and other work 
On August 18, 2010, the Standard New York Hotel was the setting for a harmonically synchronized light and sound show produced by Spiegel. The Target Kaleidoscopic Fashion Spectacular featured a fashion show on the street level, while inside the hotel, 66 dancers performed choreography synchronized with fast-paced lighting patterns set to Spiegel's music score in 150 different rooms, using the glass walls of the hotel to display a multi-floor show, highlighting that year's fall styles.

Spiegel was pivotal to the project as he not only created the score but brought together many of the other contributing artists as well. The show featured the creative direction of Mother New York, the directors at LEGS, lighting choreographers at Bionic League (who have worked with Daft Punk and Kanye West), and the dance choreographer Sir Ryan Heffington.

Spiegel was the music director for Kanye West's critically acclaimed 2008 world Glow in the Dark Tour.

Spiegel also worked on a "psycho-opera", entitled Stop The Virgens, spearheaded by his good friend, and front woman of the Yeah Yeah Yeahs, Karen O. The show is self-described as "an assault on the tragic joys of youth." The opera premiered at St. Ann's Warehouse in Brooklyn, New York, on October 12, 2011, and hosted eight performances, concluding on October 22, 2011. It was produced by The Creators Project and directed by Adam Rapp. The opera served as a live version of the songs from an album that Spiegel produced and wrote with Karen O. Spiegel, along with the guitarist from the Yeah Yeah Yeahs, Nick Zinner, served as musical directors. Also contributing to the "original live xperience" were musicians Money Mark, Brian Chase, Jack Lawrence and Patrick Keeler of the Greenhornes/Racanteours. Also credited for his work with the sound design of the project was Andrés Velásquez.

in 2017, Spiegel music directed and composed all of the original music for Opening Ceremony's "Changers' a Dance Story" directed by Spike Jonze, starring Lakeith Stanfield and Mia Wasikowska.

Producer discography

References

External links 
 Squeak E. Clean homepage
 Music video for first release, "Money"

1979 births
Living people
American people of German-Jewish descent
Musicians from Maryland
People from Bethesda, Maryland
Place of birth missing (living people)
Spiegel family